Pontal is a municipality in the state of São Paulo in Brazil. The population is 50,852 (2020 est.) in an area of 356 km2. The elevation is 515 m.

References

Municipalities in São Paulo (state)